Sexual orientation discrimination (also known as sexualism) is discrimination based on sexual orientation and/or sexual behaviour.

Sexual bias 
Sexual orientation discrimination often comes up in the context of employment actions. It usually refers to a predisposition towards heterosexual people, which is biased against lesbian, gay, and bisexual people, among others. This is specifically referred to as heterosexism. A related term is sexual prejudice, a negative attitude towards someone because of their sexual orientation. This bias is also the same as homophobia, as it is discrimination towards or against certain sexual orientations.

An earlier definition of this term is: Sexual orientation discrimination is a belief or argument that one sexual orientation or sexual behaviour is inherently superior to some or all others. Usually it comes in the form of heterosexuality being considered the only natural, normal, or moral mode of sexual behavior, and is also used to refer to the effects of that instinct. The word heterosexism has also been proposed to mean essentially the same thing as this form of sexual orientation discrimination. This word has been suggested as an alternative to homophobia, in part because it uses a parallel structure to sexism or racism. The intent of the concept of heterosexism is the examination of the cultural bias against non-heterosexuals rather than individual bias, which is the focus of homophobia, as well as the adverse effects of normative heterosexuality on heterosexual identifying people.

Forms of discrimination

Employment actions 
Employment actions (or ultimate employment actions), refer to hiring, firing, demotions, promotions, and compensation. Adverse employment actions, however, include termination, demotions, suspension, and changes to conditions, responsibilities and pay. Title VII of the Civil Rights Act of 1964 prohibits employment discrimination on the basis of sex. In Bostock v. Clayton County 590 U.S. ___ 2020, the Supreme Court found that adverse employment actions made due to an employee's sexual orientation or gender identity violates Title VII.

Service provision  
Sexual orientation discrimination also occurs at the time of service provision from a business or government agency to an individual or group. Such services may include dining at a restaurant, visiting a partner at the hospital, receiving healthcare, or acquiring a marriage license.

Sexuality or sexual nature 
The term pansexualism, seen especially in the field of early-20th-century psychoanalysis, was based on the usage of the term "sexualism" to refer to humanity's sexual nature. The terms "homosexualism" and "bisexualism" were also based on this usage, and were commonly used before the general adoption of the terms homosexuality and bisexuality.

Key court decisions

Latta v. Otter 
Latta v. Otter, 771 F.3d 456 (9th Cir. 2014) is a court case that resulted from a federal lawsuit filed by four couples from Boise, Idaho, where same-sex marriage remained illegal until the couples' victory in 2014. Prior to Latta v. Otter, only 16 U.S. states had legalized same-sex marriage, and Idaho refused to recognize same-sex marriages performed in such states. On September 8, 2014, the Ninth Circuit ruled that Idaho's ban on same-sex marriage was a violation of the U.S. Constitution's guarantee of equal protection.

Obergefell v. Hodges 
Obergefell v. Hodges, 135 S. Ct. 2584 (2015) is the landmark civil rights case that resulted in federal legalization of same-sex marriage in the United States. In July 2013, James Obergefell and John Arthur James, filed a lawsuit in the state of Ohio because of its refusal to recognize same-sex marriages on death certificates. In September 2013, the lawsuit was amended to include a second gay couple and a funeral director who feared prosecution for falsifying death certificates if he were to note same-sex spouses on gay clients' documents.

Hively v. Ivy Tech Community, College of Indiana 
Hively v. Ivy Tech Community College, __ F.3d __, 2017 WL 1230393 (7th Cir. Apr. 4, 2017) ruled in an 8-3 decision by the Seventh Circuit Court of Appeals that sex discrimination includes homophobia, and therefore violates federal civil rights law.  Part-time professor and open lesbian Kimberley Hively applied multiple times for full-time employment, but she was not approved, and her contract was not renewed. She claimed that this was due to her sexuality, and filed with the Equal Employment Opportunity Commission. The Seventh Circuit Court ruled in her favor.

Bostock v. Clayton County 
Prior to the Bostock v. Clayton County case, the language of Title VII in the Civil Rights Act of 1964 left the phrase 'on the basis of sex' up for interpretation. The U.S. Equal Employment Opportunity Commission (EEOC) has recognized members of the LGBTQ community as a protected class under Title VII since 2013, but even in 2020, only 21 states had extended employment discrimination protections to members the LGBTQ community. The Bostock ruling found that discrimination on the basis of sexual orientation or gender identity would, in fact, be considered discrimination on the basis of sex.

See also 
Antisexualism
Biphobia
Discrimination against asexual people
Heteronormativity
Heterosexism
Homophobia
Sexism
Sexualization
Transphobia

Notes

References
White, Chris, 'Nineteenth-century Writings on Homosexuality: a sourcebook' -
Wolman, Benjamin B., 'International Encyclopedia of Psychiatry, Psychology, Psychoanalysis & Neurology' (1977)
Fish, J. Heterosexism in Health & Social Care. Basingstoke: Palgrave. (2006)
Jackson, S. (2006) Gender, sexuality and heterosexuality: the complexity (and limits) of heteronormativity. Feminist Theory, 7 ( 1). pp. 105–121. ISSN 1464-7001
Michael Rusie, The Meaning of Adverse Employment Actions in the Context of Title VII Retaliation Claims,
9 WASH. U. J. L. & POL’Y 379 (2002),
https://openscholarship.wustl.edu/law_journal_law_policy/vol9/iss1/11
Bachman, Eric. “What Counts as an ‘Adverse Employment Action’ in Discrimination and Retaliation Cases?” Forbes, Forbes Magazine, 17 Nov. 2021, https://www.forbes.com/sites/ericbachman/2021/11/15/what-counts-as-an-adverse-employment-action-in-discrimination-and-retaliation-cases/. 
 Wolf, Richard (June 15, 2020). "Supreme Court grants federal job protections to gay, lesbian, transgender workers". USA Today. Archived from the original on October 8, 2020. Retrieved October 8, 2020.

LGBT and society
LGBT studies articles needing attention